Tadeusz Piotrowski may refer to:
 Tadeusz Piotrowski (mountaineer) (1940–1986), mountaineer and writer
 Tadeusz Piotrowski (sociologist) (born 1940),  Thaddeus Piotrowski, sociologist and author of books about Holocaust and the history of Poland